The Sunderland Eye Infirmary is a health facility in Sunderland, Tyne and Wear. It is managed by the South Tyneside and Sunderland NHS Foundation Trust.

History
The facility has its origins in the Sunderland and North Durham Eye Infirmary established on High Street East in 1836. It subsequently moved to Crowtree Terrace and then relocated to Stockton Road in 1893. It became the Sunderland and Durham County Eye Infirmary in 1903 and the Durham County and Sunderland Eye Infirmary in 1911. The current facility, which was financed by a gift from Sir John Priestman, a shipbuilder, was opened by Princess Elizabeth as the Sir John Priestman Durham County and Sunderland Eye Infirmary shortly after the Second World War. It joined the National Health Service in 1948.

References

Hospitals established in 1836
1836 establishments in England
Hospitals in Tyne and Wear
NHS hospitals in England
Sunderland